Anaritide (also known as human atrial natriuretic peptide [102-126])  is a synthetic analogue of atrial natriuretic peptide (ANP).

Structure 
Anartidine has the following primary structure:

 RSSCFGGRMDRIGAQSGLGCNSFRY

or

H-Arg-Ser-Ser-Cys-Phe-Gly-Gly-Arg-Met-Asp-Arg-Ile-Gly-Ala-Gln-Ser-Gly-Leu-Gly-Cys-Asn-Ser-Phe-Arg-Tyr-OH

This structure is identical to residues 102-126 of human preproANP. In comparison, active human ANP comprises resides 99-126 of human preproANP.

Medical uses 
Anaritide has been investigated as a potential therapy for acute tubular necrosis but was shown not to improve the dialysis-free survival of these patients. It also appears to exacerbate proteinuria and natriuresis in patients with nephrotic syndrome.

References 

Peptides